Dennis Franklin Cromarty High School, also known as DFC High School, is a high school for Indigenous students located in Thunder Bay, Ontario, and is administered by the Northern Nishnawbe Education Council (NNEC). It was established in 2000 and serves 20 communities around Northwestern Ontario. Aboriginal students from around Northwestern Ontario attend DFC, often flying in from remote reserve communities.

History

Northwood High School was constructed in 1963 and opened for the 1963–1964 school year. Northwood represented a new type of secondary school introduced in the 1960s known as “Special Vocational Schools.” In 1996, Northwood High School closed its doors due to economic reasons before being purchased by the Northern Nishnawbe Education Council and reopening as DFC High School in 2000.

Mission statement

The mission of Dennis Franklin Cromarty First Nations High School is to ensure students develop a strong sense of identity in the distinct language, culture and traditions of the Anishnawbek and achieve academic excellence and become active members of society.

See also
List of high schools in Ontario
Education in Thunder Bay, Ontario

References

External links
 Dennis Franklin Cromarty High School

High schools in Thunder Bay
Educational institutions established in 2000
2000 establishments in Ontario